Estadio Municipal de San Miguel Petapa, or Estadio Julio Armando Cobar,  is a multi-use stadium in San Miguel Petapa, Guatemala.

With artificial turf surface, it is used mostly for football and is the home stadium of Deportivo Petapa.  The capacity of the stadium is 7,000 people

References

External links
Wikimapia - Aerial view
Fussballtempel.net - Gallery of images

Multi-purpose stadiums in Guatemala
Football venues in Guatemala
Deportivo Petapa